Franz Friedrich Böhme (15 April 1885 – 29 May 1947) was an Army officer who served in succession with the Austro-Hungarian Army, the Austrian Army and the German Wehrmacht. He rose to the rank of general during World War II, serving as Commander of the XVIII Mountain Corps, Hitler's Plenipotentiary Commanding General in the Balkans, and commander-in-chief in German-occupied Norway during World War II. Böhme was arrested for trial by a US Army Tribunal in Nuremberg in the Hostages Trial on a charge of having massacred thousands of Serbian civilians. He committed suicide in prison.

Life and career

Franz Böhme was born in Zeltweg in Styria, Austria on 15 April 1885. He entered the Austro-Hungarian Army in October 1900 as a cadet and was commissioned as a lieutenant in an infantry regiment in 1905. He served in World War I and remained in the Austrian Bundesheer after 1918, transferring to the Wehrmacht on the Anschluss with Germany in 1938. replacing Austrian Chief of Staff Alfred Jansa.

During the opening years of World War II, Böhme held command of the 30th Infantry Division and 32nd Infantry Division, taking part in the invasion of Poland in September 1939 and in the Battle of France in May and June 1940. On 29 June 1940, he was awarded the Knight's Cross of the Iron Cross.

Between 16 September 1941 and 2 December 1941, as Commanding General and Commander of Serbia, Böhme ordered the reprisal executions of 2,000 civilians in Kragujevac after a partisan assault on 22 soldiers of the 421 Korps-Nachrichten-Abteilung.

In December 1943, Böhme was appointed Deputy Commanding General of the XVIII Corps and Commander of Wehrkreis XVIII, Salzburg. On 4 June 1944, he was delegated with the leadership of the Second Panzer Army in the Balkans with Böhme succeeding Generaloberst Lothar Rendulic.

In July 1944, Böhme was transferred to the Army's High Command Leader Reserve, giving up control of the 2nd Panzer Army to General Maximilian de Angelis. Between 8 January 1945 and 8 May 1945, he was Armed Forces Commander of Norway and Commander-in-Chief of the 20th Mountain Army.

Trial and suicide
After being captured in Norway, he was brought before the Hostages Trial, a division of the Subsequent Nuremberg Trials, and charged with war crimes committed in Serbia during his control of the region in 1941. At that time, he had increased the scale of retaliatory strikes against Serbs, killing a hundred Serbs for every German killed, and fifty for every German wounded; this resulted in the massacre of thousands of civilians. When his extradition to Yugoslavia seemed imminent, Böhme committed suicide by jumping from the 4th story of the prison in which he was being held. His body was interred at St. Leonhard-Friedhof in Graz, Austria.

Awards and decorations
 Iron Cross (1914)
 2nd Class (1916)
 1st Class (12 June 1917)
 Iron Cross (1939)
 2nd Class (12 September 1939)
 1st Class (25 September 1939)
 Order of the Cross of Liberty 1st Class with Oak leaves and Swords (Finland)
 German Cross in Gold on 10 February 1944 as General der Infanterie in the XVIII. (Gebirgs) Armeekorps
 Knight's Cross of the Iron Cross on 29 June 1940 as Generalleutnant commander of 32. Infanterie-Division

References

Citations

Bibliography

 

 
 

1885 births
1947 suicides
Austrian generals
Austro-Hungarian Army officers
Austro-Hungarian military personnel of World War I
Generals of Mountain Troops
Austrian military personnel who committed suicide
Genocide of Serbs in the Independent State of Croatia perpetrators
Recipients of the clasp to the Iron Cross, 1st class
Recipients of the Order of the Cross of Liberty, 1st Class
Recipients of the Gold German Cross
Recipients of the Knight's Cross of the Iron Cross
Suicides by jumping in Germany
People from Zeltweg
Austrian people who died in prison custody
Gebirgsjäger of World War II
People indicted by the United States Nuremberg Military Tribunals
People who committed suicide in prison custody
Austrian military personnel of World War II
Heads of government who were later imprisoned
Prisoners who died in United States military detention
German Army generals of World War II